For All We Know is the debut studio album by British electronic singer-songwriter Nao. It was released on 29 July 2016 by RCA and Little Tokyo Recordings. It has guest features by Abhi//Dijon and A. K. Paul, and received critical acclaim upon release.

Recording and production
The concept for the album came about when Nao began to feature vocals with other artists, such as Disclosure and Mura Masa. After the collaboration that she did with Disclosure on their song "Superego", it inspired Nao to work further and deeper into that genre of music. She wanted to make an album which was to bring her to fame and, after the collaborations, wanted her fans to have something to look forward to.

The album title, For All We Know was named so after the 1934 jazz song of the same name, as a reference to the artist's background in the genre. She also opened up about the album title in a YouTube trilogy she created to tell her fans about the background of creating the album. She said, "So, for me, that kind of just sums up everything for me. It's just such a lovely message So love me, love me tonight/tomorrow was made for some/tomorrow may never come/for all we know. I just thought that was so beautiful because it just says that tomorrow is not guaranteed so anything that we want to do, we have to make it happen today and I think that just kind of sums up this journey for me". In an interview with Billboard, Nao advanced that the album was "a definite nod" to 1990s music and an attempt at transposing it to actuality.

Part of the production from the album was worked on with British DJ and electronic and R&B musician GRADES. Two of the other albums' producers such as Loxe and Jungle added a funk touch. Nao's music and voice were compared to musicians FKA twigs and Kelela.

Critical reception

Upon release, the album received critical acclaim. Metacritic, which assigns a weighted average score out of 100 to reviews from mainstream critics, For All We Know received an average score of 82 out of 100, based on 14 reviews, indicating "universal acclaim".

Writing for Exclaim!, Michael J. Warren hailed the album as "a dynamic listen from start to finish". It was also reported in a number of articles that the record and the style of music that was presented on the record could have been highly influenced on the early work of American musician Prince.

Accolades

Track listing

Notes
  signifies an additional producer
  signifies a remixer

Charts

References

External links
 

2016 debut albums
Albums produced by Grades
Nao (singer) albums
RCA Records albums